Huilong Township is a township of Yanjiang District, Ziyang, Sichuan, People's Republic of China, located  east of downtown Ziyang. , it has one residential community (居委会) and 14 villages under its administration.

See also 
 List of township-level divisions of Sichuan

References 

Township-level divisions of Sichuan
Ziyang